Sluhy is a municipality and village in Prague-East District in the Central Bohemian Region of the Czech Republic. It has about 700 inhabitants.

Geography
The Mratínský Stream flows through the municipality.

History
The first written mention of Sluhy is from 1238, however the existence of the Church of Saint Adalbert in the village is documented already between 967 and 999.

Sights

The Church of Saint Adalbert is originally a Romanesque building, which was rebuilt into the Gothic style in 1270. Its current appearance is from the 18th century, when late Baroque improvements were made.

The Baroque prismatic bell tower is a building from the 16th century. It originally included three bells, but one was stolen. Next to the bell tower a former presbytery is located. It was built in 1780.

References

External links

 (in Czech)

Villages in Prague-East District